Torcha! is the second studio album by the Finnish avant-garde progressive metal band Waltari.

Track listing

 "Lights On" - 4:54
 "The Lie of the Zombie" - 4:43
 "I Held You So Long" - 4:40
 "Dedicated to the Flyers" - 2:45
 "Lust of Life" - 4:44
 "Vogue (Madonna cover)" - 4:17
 "Till the Music Nation" - 3:43
 "Fool's Gold" - 5:09
 "You Know Better" - 3:49
 "Dance Electric" - 3:46
 "Jukolauta" - 2:10
 "Death Party" - 5:17
 "I'm a Believer" - 2:21
 "Fuckadelican Garden" - 6:23
 "Waltari-lapio" - 3:20

Credits

Kärtsy Hatakka - Vocals, Bass, keyboards
Jariot Lehtinen - Guitar
Sami Yli-Sirniö - Guitar
Janne Parviainen - Drums

External links
Encyclopaedia Metallum page

Waltari albums
1992 albums